Driefontein, (Afrikaans for "Three-fountain") also known as Saul Mkhizeville is a village in Gert Sibande District Municipality in the Mpumalanga province of South Africa. It has changed its name to Mkhizeville after Saul Mkhize who was shot and killed by the apartheid police for organising a march against forceful removals.

References

Populated places in the Mkhondo Local Municipality